William L. McCrary (November 5, 1929 – July 21, 2018), nicknamed "Youngblood", was an American baseball shortstop who played for the Negro American League's Kansas City Monarchs in 1947-48, in the minor league organizations of the New York Yankees and Chicago Cubs, and with the semi-pro Omaha Rockets.

Personal life 
McCrary was born in Beloit, Wisconsin on November 5, 1929, and was adopted at seven weeks of age by Bud and Estella (Kidd) McCrary.  He received his nickname from Negro leagues legend Satchel Paige.

Following his playing career he was a foreman for Alcoa and General Motors corporations, and owned a janitorial service.  He was inducted into the Beloit (WI) Sports Hall of Fame in 2014.  Late in life, McCrary became an ambassador for the Negro leagues, often making personal appearances and sharing his experiences of life in the era of segregated baseball.  He was featured in the biography "A Legend Among Us:  The Story of William "Youngblood" McCrary" by Linda Pennington Black, published in 2014.

Bill McCrary died on July 21, 2018 in Hot Spring Village, AR at the age of 88.

References

External links

William McCrary at Negro Leagues Baseball Museum

1929 births
2018 deaths
Baseball players from Wisconsin
Sportspeople from Beloit, Wisconsin
Kansas City Monarchs players
20th-century African-American sportspeople
21st-century African-American people